is a former Japanese football player.

Playing career
Iwai was born in Saitama Prefecture on January 31, 1967. After graduating from Tokai University, he joined All Nippon Airways (later Yokohama Flügels) in 1989. He became a regular player as center back for the first season. The club won the championship at the 1993 Emperor's Cup and 1994–95 Asian Cup Winners' Cup. In 1996, he moved to the newly promoted J1 League club, Avispa Fukuoka. He retired at the end of the 1998 season.

Club statistics

References

External links

j-league.or.jp

1967 births
Living people
Tokai University alumni
Association football people from Saitama Prefecture
Japanese footballers
Japan Soccer League players
J1 League players
Yokohama Flügels players
Avispa Fukuoka players
Association football defenders